Frederick Coolidge may refer to:
 Frederick L. Coolidge, American psychologist
 Frederick S. Coolidge, U.S. Representative from Massachusetts